Notoreas chrysopeda is a species of moth in the family Geometridae. This species is endemic to New Zealand. It is a colourful day flying moth that lives in mountainous habitat.

Taxonomy
This species was described by Edward Meyrick in 1888 using material collected at Mount Arthur at an altitude of approximately 1200m in January and named Arcteuthes chrysopeda. Meyrick misspelt the genus, the correct spelling of which is Arctesthes. George Hudson discussed and illustrated this species under the name Lythria chrysopeda in both his 1898 book New Zealand moths and butterflies (Macro-lepidoptera) and his 1928 publication The Butterflies and Moths of New Zealand. Robin C. Craw placed this species within the genus Notoreas in 1986. The lectotype specimen is held at the Natural History Museum, London.

Description
 
Meyrick described the species as follows:

Distribution
This species is endemic to New Zealand. It is found in the Mount Arthur tableland.

Biology and behaviour
This species is on the wing in January and February. It is a day flying moth, most active in bright sunshine.

Habitat and host species

N. chrysopeda prefers open tussock clearings in mountainous forest habitat. Larvae of New Zealand moths within the genus Notoreas feed exclusively on plants within the genera Pimelea and Kelleria.

References

Larentiinae
Moths described in 1888
Moths of New Zealand
Endemic fauna of New Zealand
Taxa named by Edward Meyrick
Endemic moths of New Zealand